In mathematics, a solution set is the set of values that satisfy a given set of equations or inequalities.

For example, for a set  of polynomials over a ring ,

The feasible region of a constrained optimization problem is the solution set of the constraints.

Examples 
 The solution set of the single equation  is the set {0}.
 For any non-zero polynomial  over the complex numbers in one variable, the solution set is made up of finitely many points.
 However, for a complex polynomial in more than one variable the solution set has no isolated points.

Remarks 
In algebraic geometry, solution sets are called algebraic sets if there are no inequalities. Over the reals, and with inequalities, there are called semialgebraic sets.

Other meanings 

(Instead of relations depending on unknowns, one should speak more correctly of predicates, the collection E is their logical conjunction, and the solution set is the inverse image of the boolean value true by the associated boolean-valued function.)

The above meaning is a special case of this one, if the set of polynomials fi if interpreted as the set of equations fi(x)=0.

Examples

(Here, y is not "declared" as an unknown, and thus to be seen as a parameter on which the equation, and therefore the solution set, depends.)

See also
 Equation solving
 Extraneous and missing solutions

Equations